Art Cross (January 24, 1918 – April 15, 2005) was an American racecar driver. He was the first recipient of the Indianapolis 500 Rookie of the Year Award in 1952.

Racing career
Cross began racing midget cars in 1938. He received a Purple Heart for his wounds during the Battle of the Bulge in World War II. He returned to midget cars after the war, and raced in one of Pappy Hough's "Little Iron Pigs."

Cross won the first Indy 500 Rookie of the Year award after a fifth-place finish in the 1952 Indianapolis 500. Cross used his share of $27,000 from the race to purchase a farm near LaPorte, Indiana.

He finished second in the 1953 Indianapolis 500 behind Bill Vukovich. Despite it being one of the hottest Indy 500s on record, Vukovich and Cross completed the entire race without relief. Driver Carl Scarborough died from the heat. Cross' car was the "Springfield Welding Special", which was owned by Bessie Lee Paoli, who was the only female owner at the time.

After retiring from racing, he turned his attention to running the farm in LaPorte, Indiana. He later became involved in a heavy equipment business and in construction. He was inducted in the National Midget Auto Racing Hall of Fame in 1992.

Indianapolis 500 results

Complete Formula One World Championship results
(key)

References

External links

Obituary

1918 births
2005 deaths
Indianapolis 500 drivers
Indianapolis 500 Rookies of the Year
People from La Porte, Indiana
Sportspeople from Jersey City, New Jersey
Racing drivers from New Jersey
United States Army personnel of World War II